Bottmingen Castle is a castle in the municipality of Bottmingen in the canton of Basel-Land in Switzerland.  It is a Swiss heritage site of national significance.

History
The castle was probably built in the second half of the 13th century. Its oldest documented owner was the Kämmerer family, which owned it as of 1363. The castle was rebuilt during the 18th century into an early-Baroque country manor in the French style by Johannes Deucher.

See also
 List of castles in Switzerland

References

External links
 

Cultural property of national significance in Basel-Landschaft
Castles in Basel-Landschaft